Esty Clyon Chaney (January 29, 1891 – February 5, 1952) was a relief pitcher in Major League Baseball who played briefly for the Boston Red Sox and Brooklyn Tip-Tops. He was born in Hadley, Pennsylvania. 
 
In a two-game career, Chaney posted a 7.20 ERA in 5.0 innings of work, including one strikeout, four walks and eight hits allowed without a decision or saves.
 
Chaney died at the age of 61 in Cleveland, Ohio.

Sources

Boston Red Sox players
Brooklyn Tip-Tops players
Major League Baseball pitchers
Baseball players from Pennsylvania
1891 births
1952 deaths